Uri Fruchtmann (born 1955) is an Israeli human rights activist, film producer and director.

Career
He serves as the non-executive Director of Ealing Studios and co-founder of Fragile Films, an independent film production company based in the United Kingdom.

Board memberships
Fruchtmann has served on the boards of several charities. In 2008 he co-founded the UK human rights charity Videre Est Credere (Latin for "To see is to believe"). Videre describes itself as "give[ing] local activists the equipment, training and support needed to safely capture compelling video evidence of human rights violations. This captured footage is verified, analysed and then distributed to those who can create change." Fruchtmann is currently the Chairman of the Board along with film-maker Terry Gilliam, Executive Director of Greenpeace UK John Sauven and music producer Brian Eno.

Personal life
Fruchtmann was Scottish singer Annie Lennox's second husband. They have two daughters,  Lola and Tali.

Filmography

As a producer
One Family: The Price of Bread (TV documentary, 1991).
Obi (1991).
All in the Family (1992).
Stir it up (1994).
The Atlantic Records Story (1994).
Spice World (1997).
An Ideal Husband (1999).
High Heels and Low Lifes (2001).
The Importance of Being Earnest (2002).
Galoot (documentary, 2003).
Hope Springs (2003).
Grasp the Nettle (documentary, 2013).
Tawai (documentary, 2017).

As a director
Stir it up (1994).
The Atlantic Records Story (1994).

References

External links

1955 births
Living people
Israeli Jews
Israeli film producers
Israeli film directors
Israeli human rights activists
British human rights activists
Israeli expatriates in the United Kingdom